Apollodorus of Tarsus was a tragic poet of ancient Greece, who is mentioned by Eudocia and in the Suda as having written six tragedies (Child-Killer, Greeks, Odysseus, Supplicants, Thorn-Scourged, and Thyestes); only the titles of these plays have survived. Nothing further is known about him.

There is another Apollodorus of Tarsus, who was probably a grammarian, and wrote commentaries on the early dramatic writers of Greece.

Notes

Ancient Greek writers known only from secondary sources
Ancient Greek poets
Ancient Greek grammarians
People from Tarsus, Mersin
Tragic poets